Adebowale Aderinto Jordan Adebayo-Smith (born January 11, 2001) is an American professional soccer player who plays as a forward for MLS Next Pro side New England Revolution II. He previously played for Sutton United and Lincoln City and spent time on loan with Grantham Town, Boston United and Gainsborough Trinity.

Born in California, Adebayo-Smith is eligible to represent the United States, Nigeria, and England at international level.

Career

Lincoln City
He attended the EastSoccerBase football organisation in South East London and had trials with Cambridge United and Premier League side Watford, before joining Lincoln City on a two-year scholarship in August 2018 following a successful trial in which he scored against Derby County under-23 in a pre-season friendly. He was reportedly being tracked by Huddersfield Town and Wolverhampton Wanderers after scoring a hat-trick for Lincoln in a FA Youth Cup win over South Shields and scoring again in a third-round defeat at West Bromwich Albion. He made his senior debut for the "Imps" in the EFL Trophy, playing the first 63 minutes of a 2–2 draw at Accrington Stanley on December 4. Later that month he was named in "The 11", a list of 11 young footballers apprentices singled out for commendation by the League Football Education (LFE).

Loans 
On February 11, 2019, Adebayo-Smith joined Grantham Town on loan for the remainder of the season. The next day, he made his debut for Grantham Town, scoring twice in a 2-1 win over South Shields F.C. In total, he made 13 appearances for Grantham Town, scoring four times.

In August 2019, Adebayo-Smith joined Boston United on a short-term loan. His lone goal for the club came against his former club Grantham Town in the Lincolnshire Senior Cup semifinals.

Adebayo-Smith joined Northern Premier League club Gainsborough Trinity on January 1, 2020, on loan for the rest of the season. However, his loan was cut short as a result of the COVID-19 pandemic which saw the season's competition formally abandoned on March 26 with all results from the season being expunged, and no promotion or relegation taking place to, from, or within the competition. He made a total of 7 appearances for the Blues in all competitions, scoring 3 goals. Adebayo-Smith was not given a squad number in the 2020–21 season.

On October 16, 2020, Adebayo-Smith had his contract with Lincoln terminated by mutual consent.

Sutton United 
He joined Sutton United on November 30, 2020. On March 3, 2021, it was announced that Adebayo-Smith had left Sutton United in order to pursue in career in the United States.

Tampa Bay Rowdies 
On March 5, 2021, Adebayo-Smith joined USL Championship side Tampa Bay Rowdies for the 2021 season with an option for the 2022 season. Adebayo-Smith made his debut for the Rowdies on May 1, 2021, during a 3-0 victory over Charlotte Independence.

New York Red Bulls II 
In February 2022, the Rowdies sent Adebayo-Smith on loan to New York Red Bulls II for the 2022 USL Championship season. Adebayo-Smith scored his first goal for Red Bulls II on March 16, 2022 in a 1-0 victory versus Atlanta United 2.

New England Revolution II
On 8 December 2022, Adebayo-Smith signed for MLS Next Pro club New England Revolution II.

Style of play
Adebayo-Smith has been described by the All Nigeria Soccer website as a "lightning quick and very skillful striker with an eye for goal".

Statistics

References

External links
 

2001 births
Living people
Soccer players from California
American soccer players
African-American soccer players
American sportspeople of Nigerian descent
Association football forwards
American expatriate soccer players
Expatriate footballers in England
American expatriate sportspeople in England
Lincoln City F.C. players
Boston United F.C. players
Grantham Town F.C. players
Gainsborough Trinity F.C. players
Sutton United F.C. players
Tampa Bay Rowdies players
New York Red Bulls II players
New England Revolution II players
21st-century African-American sportspeople